Umm ʿĪsā bint Mūsā al-Hādī was the Abbasid princess, daughter of caliph al-Hadi, niece of caliph Harun al-Rashid and principal wife of the seventh Abbasid caliph al-Ma'mun.

Umm Isa was the daughter of Al-Hadi from one of his concubine. She was born around 783 or 785. She spend her childhood in Baghdad. She was a young child when her father died in 786. Her father was succeeded by her uncle Harun al-Rashid. Her uncle took care of her and her brother after al-Hadi's death.

Al-Ma'mun married his first wife Umm Isa, the daughter of his uncle al-Hadi, whom he married when he was eighteen years old. They had two sons, Muhammad al-Asghar, and Abd Allah.
This marriage was arranged during Harun al-Rashid's reign. 
Also, The two sons of al-Hadi, Isma'il and Ja'far married Harun-Rashid's daughters, Hamdunah and Fatimah respectively. Thus, the two daughters of Harun were also cousins and sister-in-laws of Umm Isa. She lived a secluded life in the Caliph's harem, only a few things is known about her.

Umm Isa was one or two years older  than her husband al-Ma'mun. Her husband was born on the same day when her father died and her uncle  ascended to the Caliphate.

Her uncle, caliph Harun al-Rashid had nominated his two elder sons Al-Amin and al-Ma'mun as Heir. 
Already in 792, Harun had Muhammad receive the oath of allegiance (bay'ah) with the name of al-Amin ("The Trustworthy"), effectively marking him out as his main heir, while Abd Allah was not named second heir, under the name al-Maʾmūn ("The Trusted One") until 799. Her husband al-Ma'mun became caliph after the death of her cousin and brother-in-law al-Amin. In 813, al-Amin was beheaded, and al-Maʾmūn became the undisputed Caliph.

Family
Umm Isa was related to the Abbasid ruling House both maternally and paternally. She was contemporary to several Abbasid caliphs, Abbasid prince and Princesses.

References

Sources
 
 
 Ibn al-Sāʿī (2017). Consorts of the Caliphs: Women and the Court of Baghdad
 

8th-century births
9th-century deaths
8th-century women from the Abbasid Caliphate
9th-century women from the Abbasid Caliphate
Daughters of Abbasid caliphs
Wives of Abbasid caliphs
9th-century people from the Abbasid Caliphate
9th-century Arabs